Omphale is a marble sculpture by the French artist Jean-Léon Gérôme, made between 1886 and 1887, and now kept in the Musée Georges-Garret in Vesoul. A pencil sketch of the work is kept at the Dallas Museum of Art.

History 
In the Salon of 1887, Omphale was the centre of attraction in the garden of the Palais de l'Industrie. Gérôme had seriously undermined his health by uninterrupted labour, having worked on the Omphale many days from seven in the morning till eleven at night.

Appraisal 
Fanny Field Hering describes the sculpture thus:

Frédéric Masson writes of this creation: "Gérôme has found also in sculpture that which he has so long sought for and found in painting—beauty and grace. He himself has bestowed the informing idea."

See also 

 Academic art

References

Sources 

 Hering, Fanny Field (1892). Gérôme: The Life and Works of Jean Léon Gérôme. New York, NY: Cassell Publishing Company. pp. 38, 255–256, 275–276, 288. 
 Waller, Susan (Spring 2010). "Fin de partie: A Group of Self-Portraits by Jean-Léon Gérôme". Nineteenth-Century Art Worldwide, 9(1): n.p.
 "In Focus - Jean-Léon Gérôme's Omphale". DMA Collection Online. Dallas Museum of Art. 2017. Accessed 7 July 2022.

Sculptures by Jean-Léon Gérôme